KAFE (104.1 FM, "KAFE 104.1", pronounced "Café") is a commercial FM radio station in Bellingham, Washington.  It is run by the Cascade Radio Group with the broadcast license held by Saga Broadcasting, LLC.  It airs an adult contemporary radio format, switching to Christmas music for much of November and December.  The radio studios and offices are on Yew Street Road in Bellingham.

KAFE has an effective radiated power (ERP) of 60,000 watts.  Its signal covers Northwest Washington and reaches into Vancouver and Victoria, British Columbia, and parts of the Olympic Peninsula and northern suburbs in the Seattle metropolitan area.  The transmitter is atop Mount Constitution on Orcas Island, among the towers for other local FM and TV stations.

History
Its call sign was KERI, originally broadcasting at 104.3 MHz. KERI was a sister station to KARI 550 AM in Blaine. They were owned by Birch Bay Broadcasting and the two stations simulcast a country music format.  

In the late 1970s, KERI began airing separate programming.  From 1979 to 1989, it was KNWR, carrying the TM Stereo Rock automated Adult Top 40 format.  On November 1, 1989, it flipped to an adult contemporary format, taking the KAFE call letters.  

On January 14, 2010, KAFE swapped frequencies with Vancouver's 104.1 CHHR to reduce interference with 104.5 KMCQ in Covington, Washington.

Morning drive time is hosted by Dave, Allan and Patrice.  Dave has been hosting mornings since February 2012.  Bill Davis is heard in middays and Brand Manager Scotty VanDryver hosts afternoons.

References

External links
KAFE 104.1

AFE
Mainstream adult contemporary radio stations in the United States
Radio stations established in 1965
1965 establishments in Washington (state)